The fourth season of Next Great Baker premiered on June 24, 2014. Unlike other previous seasons, the teams competed in teams of two. Other changes from the previous seasons include the addition of Jacques Torres and Bobbie Lloyd as judges, the addition of the final showdown, and the opportunity to work at Buddy's Las Vegas cake shop. However, some aspects of the show were similar, including having ten competitors (or teams) as in season 1, and the $100,000 prize awarded in each of the previous seasons remained.

Contestants
During the fourth season, there were ten different teams of two. The first episode aired on June 24, 2014. This marks the first time that there were ten competitors since the first season. Seasons two and three both had 13 competitors.

Contestant progress

 (WIN) The team(s) won the challenge.
 (WIN) The team(s) received immunity from the cake challenge.
 (HIGH) The team(s) had one of the best cakes for that challenge, but did not win.
 (IN) The team(s) did not win nor lose and advanced to the next week.
 (LOW) The team was one of the bottom cakes, but escaped the final showdown.
 (LOW) This team had one of the worst cakes, but survived by winning the final showdown.
 (OUT) The team was/were eliminated.
 (IN) The team had immunity.
 (WD) The team voluntarily withdrew from the competition.

Notes

Episodes

References

General references 
 
 
 

2014 American television seasons
Next Great Baker